Reggae on the River was an annual reggae festival active from 1983 until 2019 in Humboldt County, California. It was frequently held on the last weekend in July or on the first weekend in August.

History
Reggae on the River began in 1984 as a benefit for the Mateel Community Center, a nonprofit for southern Humboldt County, after an arsonist burnt down the community hall in Garberville. The board members at the time were Nancy Shelby and Carol Bruno who worked with Jack Arthur in organizing the festival to raise money for a new hall. It was held at French's Camp (a property located on a bend in the Eel River owned by the Arthur family near Piercy, California) every year until 2006 when financial issues forced the festival to be relocated for the next two years. 

In 2003, the annual festival celebrated its 20th year. A DVD featuring performances from the anniversary was released. It includes performances by Culture, Toots & the Maytals, Third World, Beres Hammond, Israel Vibration, Anthony B., and the Marley brothers.

2006 Conflict
The 2006 concert brought in far less money than previous years. Due to the move to a new site and the expenses incurred in removing equipment from the old location, the Mateel saw no revenue from the 2006 event.  In 2007, the festival was canceled in the wake of a legal battle between the Mateel Community Center, People Productions (the company started by Carol Bruno after leaving her position at the Mateel), and Tom Dimmick, the owner of the property which hosted the festival in 2006.  The dispute centered on revenues, with the Mateel questioning why profits estimated by People Productions did not materialize, why there was a discrepancy between the number of tickets approved and reported attendance and $300,000 in cash expenditures with no receipts.  In the wake of the cancellation of Reggae on the River, People Productions in conjunction with Tom Dimmick produced their own reggae concert at Dimmick Ranch, which was called "Reggae Rising" and took place at Dimmick Ranch on the usual first weekend in August.

New site
From 2008 the festival had occurred at Benbow Lake State Recreation Area, in Benbow, California, north of the event's original location on the Eel River. In 2013, Reggae on the River returned to its original location at French Camp (just north of Piercy, California) and its original time, the first weekend of August (sometimes the event falls on the last weekend of July, or on the transition from the end of July to the beginning of August, depending on how weekends fall on the calendar year).

In 2019, the festival was cancelled due to low attendance and financial troubles. In 2022, after the COVID-19 pandemic lockdown period was lifted, the Reggae on the River festival did not return due to venue permitting issues. However two smaller festivals were supported; the new Harvest Hangout, and the 45th Summer Arts and Music Festival.

See also

List of reggae festivals
Reggae

References

External links 
Official site

Music festivals in California
Reggae festivals in the United States
Tourist attractions in Humboldt County, California
Cannabis in California